The 2017 Marbella Cup was held on 3 January 2017 in Marbella, Spain. 

Marbella and Internazionale finished the triangular tournament tied with four points, but Inter claimed the trophy on goal difference.

Teams
  Marbella
  Linense
  Internazionale

Standings
3 points for a win, 0 points for a defeat
2 points for a penalty shoot-out win, 1 point for a penalty shoot-out defeat
Internazionale won the trophy for the first time in history

Matches

Scorers

References

External links
Official site
https://web.archive.org/web/20140203052811/http://footballimpact.com/Marbella%20Cup/index.html

2017
2016–17 in Spanish football
2016–17 in Italian football